The Diama Dam, sometimes referred to as the Maka–Diama Dam, is a gravity dam on the Senegal River, spanning the border of Senegal and Mauritania. Additionally, a ship lock built within the dam provides for navigation upstream. Plans for the dam were first drawn in 1970 when the riparian states within the Senegal River Basin Development Authority agreed to develop the Senegal River. The Diama Dam was to be constructed in conjunction with the Manantali Dam which was to be located further upstream in Mali. Construction on the Diama Dam began on 15 September 1981 and was completed on 12 August 1986. The Manantali Dam was completed in 1988. The Diama project was funded by a US$149.5 million loan from the African Development Bank. A dike further extends the dam to the north.

The small town of Diama is known as a border crossing to and from Mauritania, as the dam is the only land bridge between the two countries.

See also
Schistosomiasis
Félou Hydroelectric Plant – upstream
Gouina Hydroelectric Plant – upstream
Manantali Dam – upstream

References

Dams in Senegal
Dams in Mauritania
Dams completed in 1986
Saint-Louis Region
Trarza Region
Dams on the Senegal River
Mauritania–Senegal relations